The Chūō Club (lit. Central Club) was a political party in Japan.

History
The party was established in March 1910 by a group of around 50 MPs who had previously been members of the Boshin Club and the Daidō Club or who had sat as independents, following negotiations between the Boshin Club's Hida Kageyuki and Nakamura Yaroku and the Daidō Club's Adachi Kenzō, together with the intervention of Minister of Agriculture and Commerce Ōura Kanetake. It retained the former parties' association with the faction of the army headed by Yamagata Aritomo and Katsura Tarō.

In the 1912 elections it was reduced to 31 seats, and ceased to exist in February the following year when it merged with the reformist faction of Rikken Kokumintō to form Rikken Dōshikai.

References

Defunct political parties in Japan
Political parties established in 1910
1910 establishments in Japan
Political parties disestablished in 1913
1913 disestablishments in Japan